The Buhl City Hall, at Broadway and Elm St. in Buhl, Idaho was listed on the National Register of Historic Places in 1978.

It was designed by architect B. Morgan Nisbet and was built in 1919.  It is a two-story Mission- or Spanish Revival-style stucco building.  It has an outset center bay with a Baroque false gable.

It was deemed to be "the best example of the [Mission] style used for governmental functions" among Mission style buildings in Twin Falls County where the style was popular during  1910 to 1928.

The building was demolished on January 26, 1993.

References

City and town halls on the National Register of Historic Places in Idaho
Mission Revival architecture in Idaho
Buildings and structures completed in 1919
Twin Falls County, Idaho